Aleksei Vasilyevich Petrenko (26 March 1938 – 22 February 2017) was a Soviet and Russian film and stage actor. He played Grigori Rasputin in Elem Klimov's historical drama
Agony and Joseph Stalin in the BBC Two documentary World War II: Behind Closed Doors.

Selected filmography

 King Lear (Король Лир, 1970) as Oswald
 Agony (by Elem Klimov) (1975, Агония), Petrenko, played the role of Grigori Rasputin, released in 1982 in the West and in 1985 in the USSR.
 How Czar Peter the Great Married Off His Moor (Сказ про то, как царь Пётр арапа женил, 1976) as Peter the Great
 Twenty Days Without War (Двадцать дней без войны, 1977) as Yuri Stroganov
 Beda (Беда, 1977) as Kirill Alekseevich, the Director of the school
 Yuliya Vrevskaya (Юлия Вревская, 1978) as Stepan Knyazev
 Marriage (Женитьба, 1978) as Podkolesin Ivan Kuzmich
 Agony (1981) as Grigori Rasputin
 Farewell (Прощание, 1983) as Vorontsov
 TASS Is Authorized to Declare... (ТАСС уполномочен заявить, 1984, TV Mini-Series) as Paul Dick
 Lev Tolstoy (Лев Толстой,  1984) as Vladimir Grigoryevich Chertkov
 A Cruel Romance (Жестокий романс, 1984) as Knurov
 Day of Wrath (День гнева, 1985) as Meller
 The Prisoner of Château d'If (Узник замка Иф, 1988, TV Series) as Abbé Faria
 The Servant (Слуга, 1989) as Roman Romanovich Bryzgin
 The Feasts of Belshazzar, or a Night with Stalin (Пиры Валтасара, или Ночь со Сталиным, 1989) as Joseph Stalin
 Presence (Присутствие, 1992) as Petya
 Candles in the Dark (1993) as episode
 Musketeers Twenty Years After (Мушкетёры двадцать лет спустя, 1992) as King Charles I
 The Barber of Siberia (1998) as General Radlov
 Memoirs on Sherlock Holmes (Воспоминания о Шерлоке Холмсе, 2000, TV Series) as Arthur Conan Doyle
 In August 1944 (В августе 44-го..., 2001) as General Yegorov
 The Idiot (Идиот, 2003, TV Mini-Series) as general Ardalion Ivolgin
 Lilacs (Ветка сирени, 2007) as Nicholas Zverev
 12 (2007) as 5th Juror
 Illusion of Fear (Иллюзия страха, 2008) as Petrovsky
 World War II Behind Closed Doors: Stalin, the Nazis and the West (Вторая мировая война. За закрытыми дверями: Сталин, нацизм и и Запад, 2008, TV Series documentary) as Joseph Stalin
 Bury Me Behind the Baseboard (2009) as Granddad
 Into The Storm (Навстречу шторму, 2009, TV Movie) as Joseph Stalin
 Burnt by the Sun 2 (Утомлённые солнцем 2, 2010) as elderly lieutenant-accountant
 Petrovich (Петрович, 2012) as Trofim Petrovich Streltsov
 Viktor (Виктор, 2014) as Vetrov
 Yolki 2 (Ёлки 2, 2014) as Grigory Zemlyanikin
 Yolki 5 (Ёлки 5, 2016) as Grigory Zemlyanikin
 Hoffmaniada (Гофманиада, 2018) as Coppelius / Sandman (final film role, released posthumously)

Awards
 Honored Artist of the RSFSR (1984)
 People's Artist of the RSFSR (1988)
 Order For Merit to the Fatherland 4th class (1998)
 State Prize of the Russian Federation(1999)
People's Artist of Ukraine (1999)
 Golden Eagle Award (2007) 
 Order of Honour (2014)

References

External links

1938 births
2017 deaths
Soviet male actors
Russian people of Ukrainian descent
Russian male film actors
Russian male stage actors
People's Artists of Russia
People from Chernihiv Oblast
Recipients of the Order of Honour (Russia)
Honored Artists of the RSFSR
Recipients of the title of People's Artists of Ukraine
State Prize of the Russian Federation laureates